Get It is the third album by Welsh rock musician Dave Edmunds, released in 1977. Some of the songs were performed by an early "trio" version of Rockpile (Edmunds, Nick Lowe and Terry Williams); others (such as "I Knew the Bride" and "Little Darlin'") were recorded by Edmunds solo. Also recorded in these sessions was the non-album Edmunds-Lowe tune "As Lovers Do", which was used as the B-side of both "Here Comes the Weekend" and the later "Crawling from the Wreckage". "New York's a Lonely Town", the B-side of "Where or When" was also recorded during the six-week sessions for the album.

Two recordings that appear on Get It were from much earlier sessions. "Ju Ju Man" was recorded in 1975, while "My Baby Left Me' dated all the way back to 1969, and was performed by Edmunds backed with members of his band Love Sculpture: Mickey Gee, John Williams and Terry Williams.

Track listing
"Get Out of Denver" (Bob Seger) – 2:17
"I Knew the Bride" (Nick Lowe) – 2:57
"Back To School Days" (Graham Parker) – 2:47
"Here Comes the Weekend" (Dave Edmunds, Lowe) – 1:59
"Worn Out Suits, Brand New Pockets" (Edmunds) – 2:25
"Where or When" (Richard Rodgers, Lorenz Hart) – 2:20
"Ju Ju Man" (Jim Ford, Lolly Vegas)  – 3:23
"Get It" (Bob Kelly) – 2:20
"Let's Talk About Us" (Otis Blackwell) – 2:12
"Hey Good Lookin'" (Hank Williams) – 1:55
"What Did I Do Last Night?" (Lowe) – 1:48
"Little Darlin'" (Edmunds, Lowe) – 3:18
"My Baby Left Me" (Arthur Crudup) – 1:57

Personnel
Dave Edmunds – vocals, all guitars, bass, keyboards, drums
Nick Lowe – bass
Terry Williams – drums
Bob Andrews – keyboards, accordion
Steve Goulding – drums
Billy Rankin – drums
Paul Riley – bass

Charts

Notes

Dave Edmunds albums
1977 albums
Swan Song Records albums
Albums produced by Dave Edmunds
Albums recorded at Rockfield Studios